Sangak or nân-e sangak is a plain, rectangular, or triangular Iranian whole wheat leavened flatbread.

History
In Persian 'sangak' means little stone. The bread is baked on a bed of small river stones in an oven. There are usually two varieties of this bread offered at Iranian bakeries: the generic one which has no toppings; and the more expensive variety which is topped with poppy seeds and/or sesame seeds.

Sangak bread was traditionally the bread of the Persian army. It is mentioned for the first time in the 11th century. Each soldier carried a small quantity of pebbles which at camp were brought together to create the "sangak oven" that would bake the bread for the entire army. It was eaten with lamb kabab.

The bread has always been widely eaten in the territory of present-day Azerbaijan, but following the Soviet takeover in 1920, it became less common. The Soviets opted for mass production of bread, an option which was not amiable to the traditional, hand-formed sangak. In neighbouring Iran however, sangak never lost its popularity.

نگارخانه

See also
 Barbari bread, Iranian leavened white bread
 Lavash, a common Armenian unleavened bread
 Taftan, an Iranian bread
Sheermal,  is a saffron-flavored traditional flatbread iranian cuisine

References

External links
 

Flatbreads
Iranian breads
Azerbaijani breads